Toshiya Sukegaw (1930-2015) was a Japanese composer.

Biography 
Born in Sapporo, Toshiya Sukegawa studied with Tomojirō Ikenouchi and earned a degree in composition from Tokyo University of the Arts in 1957. In 1958, he joined Yagi No Kai (the Goat Group), a group of Japanese composers including Hikaru Hayashi, Michio Mamiya, and Yuzō Toyama. The Goat Group sought to create distinctively Japanese music assimilating Japanese folksongs and traditional music into the western art music in which they had trained.

Works 
Sukegawa composed music for most western art music instruments, including orchestra, piano, and marimba, as well as electroacoustic music. His Projection for Marimba and Four Instruments was premiered by the famed marimba player Keiko Abe in 1969.

In the 1980s and 1990s, Sukegawa became more interested in ambient music, producing six albums labeled "Bioçic Music."

References 

20th-century Japanese composers
21st-century Japanese composers
1930 births
2015 deaths